Deschooling Society is a 1971 book written by Austrian author Ivan Illich that critiques the role and practice of education in the modern world.

Summary 
Deschooling Society begins as a polemical work that then proposes suggestions for changes to education in society and learning in individual lifetimes. For example,
he calls for the use of advanced technology to support "learning webs", which incorporate "peer-matching networks", where descriptions of a person's activities and skills are mutually exchanged for the education that they would benefit from. Illich argued that, with an egalitarian use of technology and a recognition of what technological progress allows, it would be warranted to create decentralized webs that would support the goal of a truly equal educational system:

 

Illich proposes a system of self-directed education in fluid and informal arrangements, which he describes as "educational webs which heighten the opportunity for each one to transform each moment of his living into one of learning, sharing, and caring."

Learning Networks 
Developing this idea, Illich proposes four Learning Networks:
 Reference Service to Educational Objects - An open directory of educational resources and their availability to learners.
 Skills Exchange - A database of people willing to list their skills and the basis on which they would be prepared to share or swap them with others.
 Peer-Matching - A network helping people to communicate their learning activities and aims in order to find similar learners who may wish to collaborate.
 Directory of Professional Educators - A list of professionals, paraprofessionals and free-lancers detailing their qualifications, services and the terms on which these are made available.

See also 
 Unschooling

References

External links 
 
 .
 MP3 version of the book, read for the Unwelcome Guests radio show
Ivan Illichs “Deschooling society” verstehen oder mißverstehen?, June 1, 2016, Bertrand Stern 

1971 non-fiction books
Books about education
Alternative education
Education reform